The R528 is a Regional Route in Limpopo, South Africa that connects Haenertsburg with Tzaneen.

Route
It runs parallel to the R71 for its entire length. Its north-eastern terminus is an intersection with the R36 and the R71 in Tzaneen (west of the town centre) and it runs towards the south-west. It reaches its end in Haenertsburg, at another junction with the R71.

References

Regional Routes in Limpopo